Charles Robert Scott-Murray (28 December 1818 – 27 August 1882) was a British Conservative politician.

Life
He was the son of Charles Scott Murray of Danesfield House, and his wife Augusta Eliza Nixon, widow of John Buller M.P., and was educated at Eton College and Christ Church, Oxford, where he matriculated in 1837 and graduated B.A. in 1841. On his father's death in 1837, he inherited Danesfield House and had it enlarged by Anthony Salvin. He was received into the Roman Catholic Church in 1844, in Rome, and became a patron of Augustus Pugin.

Scott-Murray was elected Conservative Member of Parliament for Buckinghamshire at the 1841 general election and held the seat until 1845 when he resigned by accepting the office of Steward of the Manor of Hempholme.

One of Scott-Murray's chaplains was Thomas John Capel. The association played a part in the reception as a Catholic of John Crichton-Stuart, 3rd Marquess of Bute.

Family
Scott-Murray married on 17 September 1846 Amelia Charlotte Fraser, eldest daughter of Thomas Fraser, 12th Lord Lovat.

Their sons included Charles Aloysius Scott-Murray (1847–1909), High Sheriff of Buckinghamshire in 1890, Augustin John Alphonse Scott-Murray (1848–1871), and Basil Henry Scott-Murray (born 1858), an officer of the Scots Guards. Scott-Murray was one of the early supporters of The Oratory School, to which he sent his two elder sons who had been educated at home; but quite soon expressed reservations about it. Daughters were Mildred Frances, married in 1871 Ralph Henry Christopher Nevile; Laura Amelia Margaret; and Mary Elizabeth Charlotte.

References

External links
 

UK MPs 1841–1847
People educated at Eton College
Alumni of Christ Church, Oxford
Conservative Party (UK) MPs for English constituencies
1818 births
1882 deaths